Joel Sánchez Guerrero (born September 15, 1966 in Ciudad de México, Distrito Federal) is a Mexican race walker, who made his debut at the 1988 Summer Olympics in Seoul, South Korea. There he was disqualified in the men's 20 km race. His greatest achievement was a bronze medal in the 50 kilometres walk at the 2000 Sydney Olympics. Among his other international performances, he was the gold medallist at the 1999 Pan American Games and a silver medallist at the 1991 Pan American Games.

Personal bests
20 km: 1:19:00 hrs –  Eisenhüttenstadt, 8 May 1999
50 km: 3:44:36 hrs –  Sydney, 29 September 2000

Achievements

References

External links
Tilastopaja biography

1966 births
Living people
Mexican male racewalkers
Olympic athletes of Mexico
Olympic bronze medalists for Mexico
Athletes (track and field) at the 1988 Summer Olympics
Athletes (track and field) at the 1992 Summer Olympics
Athletes (track and field) at the 2000 Summer Olympics
Athletes (track and field) at the 1991 Pan American Games
Athletes (track and field) at the 1999 Pan American Games
Athletes from Mexico City
Olympic bronze medalists in athletics (track and field)
Pan American Games medalists in athletics (track and field)
Pan American Games gold medalists for Mexico
Pan American Games silver medalists for Mexico
Medalists at the 2000 Summer Olympics
Medalists at the 1991 Pan American Games
Medalists at the 1999 Pan American Games
20th-century Mexican people